The Panther FF (Felber Ferrari) was a 2-door open roadster sports car produced by Panther Westwinds in 1974 and 1975. The car was powered by a 4.0 L (3967 cc) Ferrari Colombo V12 engine for which an output of 300 bhp was claimed.

The body was made of hand beaten aluminum and the upholstery was made of real leather.

Sources and further reading

FF
Retro-style automobiles
Luxury vehicles
Cars introduced in 1974
Roadsters